Jorge Fernando Quiroga Ramírez (born 5 May 1960), often referred to as Tuto, is a Bolivian industrial engineer and politician who served as the 62nd president of Bolivia from 2001 to 2002. A former member of Nationalist Democratic Action, he previously served as the 36th vice president of Bolivia from 1997 to 2001 under Hugo Banzer and as minister of finance under Jaime Paz Zamora in 1992. During the interim government of Jeanine Áñez, he briefly served as the country's international delegate to denounce human rights violations from 2019 to 2020.

Quiroga was a candidate in the 2005 and 2014 presidential elections, in which President Evo Morales was elected for a first and third term respectively. In both elections, Quiroga ran on the Christian Democratic Party ticket. In the 2020 presidential election, Quiroga ran as a candidate for the Libre21 coalition, but withdrew his candidacy on 11 October 2020 (seven days prior to the election) in an unsuccessful attempt to unify the Bolivian opposition and prevent the socialist MAS-IPSP candidate Luis Arce from emerging victorious.

Background and early life

Quiroga was born in Cochabamba. He graduated from Texas A&M University in 1981 with a degree in industrial engineering, becoming the first head of state from that university. He went on to work for IBM in Austin, Texas while earning a master's degree in business administration from St. Edward's University. He and his American wife Virginia then moved back to Bolivia. He has 4 children: Vanessa Elena, Cristina Andrea, Adriana Patricia and Jorge Cristian.

Vice President of Bolivia (1997–2001)
Quiroga was Minister of Finance in 1992. He was elected as Vice President of Bolivia in 1997 running on the Nationalist Democratic Action ticket with former dictator Hugo Banzer. At 37, he was the youngest vice president in Bolivia's history.

President of Bolivia (2001–2002)

He became President when Banzer resigned because of aggravated health problems (he died a year following his resignation). Quiroga assumed office as acting president on 1 July 2001 and was sworn-in on 7 August, to complete Banzer's five-year mandate.

Soon after becoming President he told a reporter from the New Yorker "We [Bolivia] will be the vital heart of South America.." believing that gas exports would lift the economy, that a long-anticipated transcontinental highway connecting Brazil to Chile would be built passing through the Bolivian city of Cochabamba, and that fibre-optic cables would soon be laid. He blamed Bolivia’s lack of economic progress on hypocrisy on free trade in  the United States and Europe, saying "Bolivia is the most open economy in Latin America. Meanwhile, American and European farm subsidies, along with tariffs on textiles and agricultural products, make it impossible for Bolivia to sell its exports in the Global North. They tell us to be competitive while tying our arms behind our backs." When asked about the Bolivian Water Wars of 2000, he said “A lot of things certainly could have been different along the way, from a lot of different actors. The net effect is that we have a city today with no resolution to the water problem. In the end it will be necessary to bring in private investment to develop the water."

Post-presidency (2002–present) 

Quiroga ran for President in his own right in the 2005 election, as the candidate for a new right-of-center coalition known as Social and Democratic Power (PODEMOS), which included the bulk of Banzer's former ADN organization. His main opponent was the leftist Evo Morales of the Movement Towards Socialism. Morales won the election and Quiroga finished a distant second place, receiving 28.6% of the vote.

He has also worked as a consultant for the World Bank and the International Monetary Fund. In 2002, he was honored in a tribute exhibit at his alma mater, Texas A&M University. He is, as of November 2016, active in the private sector and many international organizations, among them: as Vice-President of Club de Madrid with almost 100 former heads of state and government; on the board of Results for Development-R4D in Washington D.C.; as a member of the Inter-American Dialogue and the International Advisory Council of the China Economic Club; and in different capacities on the Global Adaptation Institute, the Foro Iberoamericano and many others. He has presided FUNDEMOS since 2002, a Bolivian public policy foundation. His areas of expertise are: management of international aid and cooperation for developing countries; macroeconomic policy; constitutional, legal and institutional reforms; private and official external debt restructuring and relief; programs to reduce drug trafficking and cocaine production; and broadly in Latin American public policy, trade, economics, finance and banking, integration, politics and development issues.

He was appointed as vice president of the Club de Madrid in 2011.

On 2 December 2019, the interim government of Jeanine Áñez appointed Quiroga as an international delegate on a special mission to denounce human rights violations by the ousted Morales administration. He held the post for just over a month, before resigning on 8 January 2020 in order to announce his presidential candidacy for the snap elections to be held later that year. Throughout the election cycle, he remained around sixth place reaching between 1 to 2% in opinion polling and never surpassing 7%. On 11 October, one week before the scheduled election, Quiroga announced he was dropping out of the presidential race. He indicated in his withdrawal announcement that he wished to prevent an outright victory of Luis Arce of the Movement for Socialism party in the first electoral round by consolidating the right around Carlos Mesa.

See also
Cabinet of Jorge Quiroga
List of presidents of Bolivia
Politics of Bolivia

References

External links

Member profile at The Dialogue
Profile at the BBC
thebatt
Bolivia's Precarious Upcoming Election-Council on Hemispheric Affairs

1960 births
Living people
20th-century Bolivian politicians
21st-century Bolivian politicians
Áñez administration personnel
Banzer administration cabinet members
Bolivian engineers
Candidates in the 2005 Bolivian presidential election
Candidates in the 2014 Bolivian presidential election
Candidates in the 2020 Bolivian presidential election
Christian Democratic Party (Bolivia) politicians
Grand Crosses of the Order of the Sun of Peru
Finance ministers of Bolivia
Members of the Inter-American Dialogue
Nationalist Democratic Action politicians
Paz Zamora administration cabinet members
People from Cochabamba
Presidents of Bolivia
Social Democratic Power politicians
St. Edward's University alumni
Texas A&M University alumni
Vice presidents of Bolivia